Castrillo de la Vega is a Spanish town and municipality in the south of the province of Burgos, in the Ribera del Duero wine region. It has a population of roughly 657 people. The post code for the town is 09391. The closest airport is in Valladolid.

Sources and external links
Castrillo de la Vega

References

Municipalities in the Province of Burgos